The following outline is provided as an overview of and topical guide to Saint Vincent and the Grenadines:

Saint Vincent and the Grenadines is a sovereign island nation located in the Lesser Antilles archipelago in the Caribbean Sea.  Its  territory consists of the main island of Saint Vincent and the northern two-thirds of the Grenadines.  The country has a French and British colonial history and is now part of the Commonwealth of Nations and CARICOM.

General reference 

 Pronunciation:
 Common English country name:  Saint Vincent and the Grenadines
 Official English country name:  Saint Vincent and the Grenadines
 Common endonym: Saint Vincent and the Grenadines
 Official endonym: Saint Vincent and the Grenadines
 Adjectival(s):
 Demonym(s):
 Etymology: Name of Saint Vincent and the Grenadines
 ISO country codes:  VC, VCT, 670
 ISO region codes:  See ISO 3166-2:VC
 Internet country code top-level domain:  .vc

Geography of Saint Vincent and the Grenadines 

Geography of Saint Vincent and the Grenadines
 Saint Vincent and the Grenadines is:
 an archipelago
 a country
 an island country
 a nation state
 a Commonwealth realm
 Location:
 Northern Hemisphere and Western Hemisphere
 North America (though not on the mainland)
 Atlantic Ocean
 North Atlantic
 Caribbean
 Antilles
 Lesser Antilles
 Windward Islands
 Saint Vincent (island) and the northern two-thirds of the Grenadines
 Time zone:  Eastern Caribbean Time (UTC-04)
 Extreme points of Saint Vincent and the Grenadines
 High:  Soufrière 
 Low:  Caribbean Sea 0 m
 Land boundaries:  none
 Coastline:  84 km
 Population of Saint Vincent and the Grenadines: 120,000  - 182nd most populous country

 Area of Saint Vincent and the Grenadines: 389
 Atlas of Saint Vincent and the Grenadines

Environment of Saint Vincent and the Grenadines 

 Climate of Saint Vincent and the Grenadines
 Renewable energy in Saint Vincent and the Grenadines
 Geology of Saint Vincent and the Grenadines
 Protected areas of Saint Vincent and the Grenadines
 Biosphere reserves in Saint Vincent and the Grenadines
 National parks of Saint Vincent and the Grenadines
 Wildlife of Saint Vincent and the Grenadines
 Fauna of Saint Vincent and the Grenadines
 Birds of Saint Vincent and the Grenadines
 Mammals of Saint Vincent and the Grenadines

Natural geographic features of Saint Vincent and the Grenadines 

 Fjords of Saint Vincent and the Grenadines
 Glaciers of Saint Vincent and the Grenadines
 Islands of Saint Vincent and the Grenadines
 Lakes of Saint Vincent and the Grenadines
 Mountains of Saint Vincent and the Grenadines
 Volcanoes in Saint Vincent and the Grenadines
 Rivers of Saint Vincent and the Grenadines
 Waterfalls of Saint Vincent and the Grenadines
 Valleys of Saint Vincent and the Grenadines
 World Heritage Sites in Saint Vincent and the Grenadines: None

Regions of Saint Vincent and the Grenadines 

Regions of Saint Vincent and the Grenadines

Ecoregions of Saint Vincent and the Grenadines 

List of ecoregions in Saint Vincent and the Grenadines
 Ecoregions in Saint Vincent and the Grenadines

Demography of Saint Vincent and the Grenadines 

Demographics of Saint Vincent and the Grenadines

Government and politics of Saint Vincent and the Grenadines 

Politics of Saint Vincent and the Grenadines
 Form of government:
 Capital of Saint Vincent and the Grenadines: Kingstown
 Elections in Saint Vincent and the Grenadines
 Political parties in Saint Vincent and the Grenadines

Branches of the government of Saint Vincent and the Grenadines 

Government of Saint Vincent and the Grenadines

Executive branch of the government of Saint Vincent and the Grenadines 
 Head of state: King of Saint Vincent and the Grenadines, King Charles III
 Head of government:  Prime Minister of Saint Vincent and the Grenadines,
 Cabinet of Saint Vincent and the Grenadines

Legislative branch of the government of Saint Vincent and the Grenadines 

 Parliament of Saint Vincent and the Grenadines (bicameral)
 Upper house: Senate of Saint Vincent and the Grenadines
 Lower house: House of Commons of Saint Vincent and the Grenadines

Judicial branch of the government of Saint Vincent and the Grenadines 

Court system of Saint Vincent and the Grenadines
 Supreme Court of Saint Vincent and the Grenadines

Foreign relations of Saint Vincent and the Grenadines 

Foreign relations of Saint Vincent and the Grenadines
 Diplomatic missions in Saint Vincent and the Grenadines
 Diplomatic missions of Saint Vincent and the Grenadines

International organization membership 
Saint Vincent and the Grenadines is a member of:

African, Caribbean, and Pacific Group of States (ACP)
Agency for the Prohibition of Nuclear Weapons in Latin America and the Caribbean (OPANAL)
Caribbean Community and Common Market (Caricom)
Caribbean Development Bank (CDB)
Commonwealth of Nations
Food and Agriculture Organization (FAO)
Group of 77 (G77)
International Bank for Reconstruction and Development (IBRD)
International Civil Aviation Organization (ICAO)
International Criminal Court (ICCt) (signatory)
International Criminal Police Organization (Interpol)
International Development Association (IDA)
International Federation of Red Cross and Red Crescent Societies (IFRCS)
International Fund for Agricultural Development (IFAD)
International Labour Organization (ILO)
International Maritime Organization (IMO)
International Monetary Fund (IMF)
International Olympic Committee (IOC)
International Organization for Standardization (ISO) (subscriber)

International Red Cross and Red Crescent Movement (ICRM)
International Telecommunication Union (ITU)
International Trade Union Confederation (ITUC)
Multilateral Investment Guarantee Agency (MIGA)
Nonaligned Movement (NAM)
Organisation for the Prohibition of Chemical Weapons (OPCW)
Organization of American States (OAS)
Organization of Eastern Caribbean States (OECS)
United Nations (UN)
United Nations Conference on Trade and Development (UNCTAD)
United Nations Educational, Scientific, and Cultural Organization (UNESCO)
United Nations Industrial Development Organization (UNIDO)
Universal Postal Union (UPU)
World Confederation of Labour (WCL)
World Federation of Trade Unions (WFTU)
World Health Organization (WHO)
World Intellectual Property Organization (WIPO)
World Trade Organization (WTO)

Law and order in Saint Vincent and the Grenadines 

Law of Saint Vincent and the Grenadines
 Constitution of Saint Vincent and the Grenadines
 Crime in Saint Vincent and the Grenadines
 Human rights in Saint Vincent and the Grenadines
 LGBT rights in Saint Vincent and the Grenadines
 Freedom of religion in Saint Vincent and the Grenadines
 Law enforcement in Saint Vincent and the Grenadines

Military of Saint Vincent and the Grenadines 

Military of Saint Vincent and the Grenadines
 Command
 Commander-in-chief:
 Ministry of Defence of Saint Vincent and the Grenadines

Local government in Saint Vincent and the Grenadines 

Local government in Saint Vincent and the Grenadines

History of Saint Vincent and the Grenadines 

History of Saint Vincent and the Grenadines
 Timeline of the history of Saint Vincent and the Grenadines
 Portal: Current events/Saint Vincent and the Grenadines|Current events of Saint Vincent and the Grenadines
 Military history of Saint Vincent and the Grenadines

Culture of Saint Vincent and the Grenadines 

Culture of Saint Vincent and the Grenadines
 Architecture of Saint Vincent and the Grenadines
 Cuisine of Saint Vincent and the Grenadines
 Festivals in Saint Vincent and the Grenadines
 Languages of Saint Vincent and the Grenadines
 Media in Saint Vincent and the Grenadines
 National symbols of Saint Vincent and the Grenadines
 Coat of arms of Saint Vincent and the Grenadines
 Flag of Saint Vincent and the Grenadines
 National anthem of Saint Vincent and the Grenadines
 People of Saint Vincent and the Grenadines
 Public holidays in Saint Vincent and the Grenadines
 Records of Saint Vincent and the Grenadines
 Religion in Saint Vincent and the Grenadines
 Christianity in Saint Vincent and the Grenadines
 Hinduism in Saint Vincent and the Grenadines
 Islam in Saint Vincent and the Grenadines
 Judaism in Saint Vincent and the Grenadines
 Sikhism in Saint Vincent and the Grenadines
 World Heritage Sites in Saint Vincent and the Grenadines: None

Art in Saint Vincent and the Grenadines 
 Art in Saint Vincent and the Grenadines
 Cinema of Saint Vincent and the Grenadines
 Literature of Saint Vincent and the Grenadines
 Music of Saint Vincent and the Grenadines
 Television in Saint Vincent and the Grenadines
 Theatre in Saint Vincent and the Grenadines

Sports in Saint Vincent and the Grenadines 

Sport in Saint Vincent and the Grenadines
 Football in Saint Vincent and the Grenadines
Saint Vincent and the Grenadines at the Olympics

Economy and infrastructure of Saint Vincent and the Grenadines 

Economy of Saint Vincent and the Grenadines
 Economic rank, by nominal GDP (2007): 175th (one hundred and seventy fifth)
 Agriculture in Saint Vincent and the Grenadines
 Banking in Saint Vincent and the Grenadines
 National Bank of Saint Vincent and the Grenadines
 Communications in Saint Vincent and the Grenadines
 Internet in Saint Vincent and the Grenadines
 Companies of Saint Vincent and the Grenadines
Currency of Saint Vincent and the Grenadines: Dollar
ISO 4217: XCD
 Energy in Saint Vincent and the Grenadines
 Energy policy of Saint Vincent and the Grenadines
 Oil industry in Saint Vincent and the Grenadines
 Mining in Saint Vincent and the Grenadines
 Tourism in Saint Vincent and the Grenadines
 Transport in Saint Vincent and the Grenadines
 Saint Vincent and the Grenadines Stock Exchange

Education in Saint Vincent and the Grenadines 

Education in Saint Vincent and the Grenadines

Infrastructure of Saint Vincent and the Grenadines
 Health in Saint Vincent and the Grenadines
 Transportation in Saint Vincent and the Grenadines
 Airports in Saint Vincent and the Grenadines
 Rail transport in Saint Vincent and the Grenadines
 Roads in Saint Vincent and the Grenadines
 Water supply and sanitation in Saint Vincent and the Grenadines

See also 

Saint Vincent and the Grenadines
Index of Saint Vincent and the Grenadines-related articles
List of international rankings
List of Saint Vincent and the Grenadines-related topics
Member state of the Commonwealth of Nations
Member state of the United Nations
Monarchy of Saint Vincent and the Grenadines
Outline of geography
Outline of North America
Outline of the Caribbean

References

External links 

St. Vincent Paper Money
St Vincent and the Grenadines Genealogy Research
Saint Vincent Bank
Official website of the Government of St. Vincent and the Grenadines
Official website of the SVG Indian Heritage Foundation

Saint Vincent and the Grenadines
 1